"Drop" is a song by American rapper Rich Boy featuring Polow da Don. The song, produced by Cha-Lo, was released as a single on January 20, 2009, under Interscope Records.

The single charted on Billboards Bubbling Under R&B/Hip-Hop Singles chart where it was peaked at #1 during the week of February 28, 2009.

The song is also known for being widely used by other rappers to freestyle over, including Kid Cudi, Cassidy, Childish Gambino, Jay Rock, as well as Earl Sweatshirt of OFWGKTA.

Charts

References

2009 singles
2009 songs
Rich Boy songs
Interscope Records singles
Song recordings produced by Polow da Don